Jerald Lee Schoonmaker (December 14, 1933 – March 18, 2018) was an American professional baseball player. An outfielder, Schoonmaker was signed to a $30,000 bonus contract by the Washington Senators of Major League Baseball in 1955 after a standout career at the University of Missouri. However, his career was hampered by the Bonus Rule, which compelled him to spend his first two years as a professional on the Washington roster. Then, after his only minor league season, he sustained a career-ending eye injury in December 1958.

A three-sport (baseball, basketball and football) athlete in his hometown of Lebanon, Missouri, Schoonmaker batted close to .400 in his junior season at Missouri (when the Tigers won the NCAA Division I Baseball Championship) and captained the baseball team during his senior season. He won a silver medal with the United States team at the 1955 Pan American Games. After signing with Washington, he appeared in 20 games for the Senators in 1955, batting 46 times; then, after spending 1956 serving in the U.S. military, he spent his mandatory second year, 1957, on the Senator roster, playing in 30 contests but registering only 23 at-bats.

In 1958, Washington was finally permitted to send Schoonmaker to the minor leagues for much-needed experience, but he batted only .222 in 139 games, most of them with the Charlotte Hornets of the Class A Sally League. That offseason, he underwent surgery after an errant sliver of metal injured his left eye while he was working at a construction job. His vision compromised, he retired from professional baseball at the age of 25.

All told, Schoonmaker registered nine hits in 69 MLB at bats, including one double, triple and one home run. His homer was surrendered by Steve Gromek of the Detroit Tigers on July 23, 1955.

Schoonmaker died March 18, 2018.

See also
List of baseball players who went directly to Major League Baseball

References

External links

1933 births
2018 deaths
All-American college baseball players
Baseball players at the 1955 Pan American Games
Baseball players from Missouri
Charlotte Hornets (baseball) players
Chattanooga Lookouts players
Major League Baseball outfielders
Missouri Tigers baseball players
Pan American Games medalists in baseball
Pan American Games silver medalists for the United States
People from Lebanon, Missouri
People from Webster County, Missouri
Washington Senators (1901–1960) players
Medalists at the 1955 Pan American Games